Jack Turner (24 June 1926 – 20 December 2016) was an Australian rules footballer who played with Richmond in the Victorian Football League (VFL).

Notes

External links 		
		
		
		
		
		
		
2016 deaths		
1926 births		
		
Australian rules footballers from Victoria (Australia)		
Richmond Football Club players